Amal Neerad (7 October 1976) is an Indian film director, cinematographer and producer who mainly works in Malayalam Cinema. He attended the Satyajit Ray Film and Television Institute, Kolkata (first batch). He was awarded the National Film Award for Best Cinematography (special mention) in 2001 for his diploma film Meena Jha (short feature section).

He started his career shooting music videos, documentaries and advertising. It was his diploma film that brought him to the attention of Ram Gopal Verma and his team. Neerad moved into Hindi Cinema with three back to back films; James (2004), Darna Zaroori Hai (2006) and Shiva (2006). In 2004, he also shot the Malayalam Film 'Black'.

Early and personal life
Amal Neerad was born in Kollam, Kerala. He attended school and college in Kochi. He was the college union chairman of Maharaja's College, Ernakulam during two consecutive terms, 1992–93 and 1993–94. 

He married actress Jyothirmayi on 4 April 2015.

Career 

Amal joined Satyajit Ray Film and Television Institute in 1995. He is a winner of National Film Awards for best cinematography. After his graduation from the institute he worked as a cinematographer with Ram Gopal Varma's production company for the films such as James, Darna Zaroori Hai and Shiva. His debut movie in Malayalam as cinematographer was Black, directed by Ranjith.

In 2007, he made his directorial debut Big B starring Mammootty and Shereveer Vakil. Even though the movie was an average grosser at the box office, the stylish narrative and technical brilliance that the film possessed apparently gave the movie an iconic stature and cult following. His next film was Sagar Alias Jacky starring Mohanlal, a sequel of 1987 film Irupatham Noottandu. In 2010, He directed Anwar with Prithviraj and Prakash Raj in lead roles.

Amal Neerad launched his production company Amal Neerad Productions through the 2012 film Bachelor Party directed by himself. In 2013, he produced the anthology film, 5 Sundarikal. Amal directed the segment Kullante Bharya starred Dulquer Salmaan and handled camera for the segment Aami, directed by Anwar Rasheed. He directed and co-produced (with Fahad Faasil) the period thriller Iyobinte Pustakam starring Fahadh Faasil, Lal, and Jayasurya in 2014. In 2017, he produced and directed Comrade In America starring Dulquer Salmaan. He later directed Fahadh Faasil starred Varathan in 2018. The movie was jointly produced by Neerad and Fahadh Faasil. Amal joined hands with Anwar Rasheed again as a cinematographer for the movie Trance, starring Fahadh Faasil. Later, he joined Mammootty again after 15 years for the movie Bheeshma Parvam which emerged as one of the biggest hits in Mollywood industry.

Filmography

Awards and recognitions

His film Iyobinte Pustakam bagged best film in 2014 Asianet Film Awards. 

 2014 Kerala State Film Awards
 Best Cinematography: Amal Neerad

References

External links

 - Amal Neerad Productions Official YouTube Channel

Malayalam film directors
Living people
Malayalam film cinematographers
1975 births
Satyajit Ray Film and Television Institute alumni
Artists from Kollam
Film producers from Kerala
21st-century Indian film directors
21st-century Indian photographers
Cinematographers from Kerala